The Patty Duke Show is an American television sitcom starring Patty Duke, William Schallert, Jean Byron, Paul O'Keefe and Eddie Applegate that originally ran on the American Broadcasting Company (ABC) from September 18, 1963 to April 27, 1966.

Series overview

Episodes

Pilot
The unaired pilot episode was filmed at Metro-Goldwyn-Mayer Studios in Culver City, California, with San Francisco as the setting for the series. Mark Miller played Martin Lane and Charles Herbert played Ross Lane, but in the episode "The Cousins," William Schallert and Paul O'Keefe played their respective roles; this is also the first of John McGiver's five appearances in the series, guest-starring as J.R. Castle, Martin and Kenneth's boss at The New York Daily Chronicle (he later returns in the episodes "The Elopement," "The Christmas Present," "Auld Lang Syne" and "The Cousins"). San Francisco locations were also used in many scenes.

Season 1 (1963–64)

Season 2 (1964–65)

Season 3 (1965–66)

References

External links

Lists of American sitcom episodes